Ondino is a male given name. Notable people with the name include:
Ondino Sant'Anna (1940–2010), Brazilian actor, brother of Dedé 
Ondino Viera (1901–1997), Uruguayan football manager

Masculine given names